Henry Charles Marx (1875–1947) was the American inventor of numerous musical instruments, most notably the marxophone and the marxolin.

References

Inventors of musical instruments
American inventors
1875 births
1947 deaths